Super-imperialism is a Marxist term with two possible meanings. It refers either to the hegemony of an imperialist great power over its weaker rivals which then are called sub-imperialisms, or to a comprehensive supra-structure above a set of theoretically equal-righted imperialist states. The latter meaning is the older one and had become rare by the middle of the 20th century.

Etymology 
The expression super-imperialism first appeared in November 1914 as an inaccurate translation of the newly coined German term Ultra-Imperialismus. William E. Bohn, the translator of Karl Kautsky’s article "Der Imperialismus" ("The Imperialism"), seemed to believe that the terms Kartell and Ultra-Imperialismus were not reasonable for the audience of the International Socialist Review, an American Marxist journal. Bohn faced a double problem as cartels were much less familiar in the United States than the concern-like, tauter organized trust entities and the word ultra, which in English means "exaggerated" or "extreme". Thus, he paraphrased Kautsky's ideas in terms more familiar to American readers, somewhat distorting Kautsky's statement.

Recent meanings 
Together with the revival of the imperialism debates in the 1970s, the term super-imperialism recovered, but was modified in its content. It served now to describe the domination by the super-power United States within a system of imperialism in which the other imperialist powers were set back in their abilities and thus were second-class. Since the same time, the German term Ultraimperialismus was translated into English literally with ultra-imperialism and was now used to describe a rather equal-righted inter-imperialist cooperation.

References

Literature 
 Michael Hudson: Super Imperialism. The Economic Strategy of American Empire (Third Edition), Islet, 2021. 
 Karl Kautsky: Imperialism and the War, in: International socialist review, 15 (1914).
 Karl Kautsky: Der Imperialismus, in: Die Neue Zeit. 32 (1914), vol. 2, p. 908–922.
 Holm A. Leonhardt: Bibliographie zur Ultraimperialismus-Theorie [Bibliography on Ultraimperialism Theory], in: Homepage of the Institute of History of Hildesheim University, http://www.uni-hildesheim.de/media/geschichte/Geschichte Ultraimperialismustheorie.pdf (available since 1-20-2008).
 Holm A. Leonhardt: Zur Geschichte der Ultraimperialismus-Theorie 1902–1930. Die Ideengeschichte einer frühen Theorie der politischen Globalisierung [On the History of Ultra-Imperialism Theory], in: Homepage of the Institute of History, Hildesheim Universität (Germany) http://www.uni-hildesheim.de/de/30219.htm (available since 1-20-2008).
 Bob Rowthorn: Imperialism in the Seventies: Unity or Rivalry? , in: New Left Review, 59 (1971).
 Martin Thomas: Introduction to Kautsky's "Ultra-imperialism". Workers Liberty.
 Dan Jakopovich, ''In the Belly of the Beast: Challenging US Imperialism and the Politics of the Offensive'

International relations theory
Hegemony
Imperialism studies
Marxist terminology